Events from the year 1563 in India.

Events
 Colóquios dos simples e drogas da India, a discussion on Indian drugs, by Garcia de Orta is first published.

Births
 April 15 – Guru Arjan Dev, Sikh guru is born (dies 1606)
 Steven van der Hagen, first admiral of the Dutch East India Company is born in Amersfoort (dies 1621)

Deaths
 Gaspar Correia, a Portuguese historian and author of 'Lendas da Índia ( "Legends of India"), dies (born c. 1486)

See also
 Timeline of Indian history